The girls' 6 km sprint biathlon competition at the 2016 Winter Youth Olympics was held on 14 February at the Birkebeineren Ski Stadium.

Results
The race was started at 14:45.

References

Biathlon at the 2016 Winter Youth Olympics